Anatolomys is an extinct genus of rodent, from the Baranomyinae subfamily of Cricetidae family. It lived in Pliocene epoch, and its fossils had been found in China. The only species in the genus, Anatolomys teilhardi,  was described by Samuel Schaub in 1934.

References 

Cricetidae
Pliocene mammals of Asia
Prehistoric rodents
Fossil taxa described in 1934